Suzanne Stettinius (born January 22, 1988 in Virginia Beach, Virginia) of Parkton, Maryland is a modern pentathlete who represented the United States at the 2012 Olympics in the modern pentathlon.

Education
Stettinius attended Hereford High School.  Stettinius graduated from McDaniel College in Westminster, Maryland after spending one year at Bethany College in Bethany, West Virginia.

National and international competition
Stettinius earned a silver medal at the NORCECA (North and Central America and Caribbean) Open that functioned as the Olympic qualifying event.  Stettinius was awarded her spot in the Olympics when the UIPM announced the 2nd Round Olympic Allocations.  Stettinius took seventh in the modern pentathlon of the 2011 Pan American Games, won the 2011 NORCECA Championships, finished 2nd at the 2009 NORCECA Championships, and is a two-time national runner-up.

References

External links
 USA Pentathlon profile
 

1988 births
Living people
American female modern pentathletes
Modern pentathletes at the 2012 Summer Olympics
Modern pentathletes at the 2011 Pan American Games
Olympic modern pentathletes of the United States
People from Parkton, Maryland
McDaniel College alumni
Pan American Games competitors for the United States
21st-century American women